The Edict of Milan (Diatagma tōn Mediolanōn) was the February 313 AD agreement to treat Christians benevolently within the Roman Empire. Western Roman Emperor Constantine I and Emperor Licinius, who controlled the Balkans, met in Mediolanum (modern-day Milan) and, among other things, agreed to change policies towards Christians following the edict of toleration issued by Emperor Galerius two years earlier in Serdica. The Edict of Milan gave Christianity legal status and a reprieve from persecution but did not make it the state church of the Roman Empire. That occurred in AD 380 with the Edict of Thessalonica.

The document is found in Lactantius's De mortibus persecutorum and in Eusebius of Caesarea's History of the Church with marked divergences between the two. Whether or not there was a formal 'Edict of Milan'  is no longer really debated among scholars who generally reject the story as it has come down in church history.

The version found in Lactantius is not in the form of an edict. It is a letter from Licinius to the governors of the provinces in the Eastern Empire he had just conquered by defeating Maximinus later in the same year and issued in Nicomedia.

Background
The Romans thought of themselves as highly religious, and attributed their success as a world power to their collective piety (pietas) in maintaining good relations with the gods. The Romans were known for the great number of deities that they honored. The presence of Greeks on the Italian peninsula introduced some religious practices such as the cult of Apollo. The Romans looked for common ground between their major gods and those of the Greeks, adapting Greek myths and iconography for Latin literature and Roman art. According to legends, most of Rome's religious institutions could be traced to its founders; this archaic religion was the foundation of the mos maiorum, "the way of the ancestors" or simply "tradition", viewed as central to Roman identity. Through interpretatio graeca and interpretatio romana, the religions of other peoples incorporated into the Roman Empire coexisted within the Roman theological hierarchy.

The Judeo-Christian insistence on Yahweh being the only God, believing all other gods were false gods, could not be fitted into the system. Their scruples prevented them swearing loyalty oaths directed at the emperor's divinity. More particularly, the refusal of Christians to pay the Jewish tax was perceived as a threat not just to the state cult, but to the state itself, leading to various forms of persecution. The emperor Decius (r. 249–251) issued edicts that imposed hard restrictions on Christians, a policy continued by his successor Valerian. With the accession of Gallienus (r. 253–268), the Church enjoyed a period of nearly 40 years with no official sanctions against Christians, which Eusebius described as the "little" peace of the Church. In 311, Galerius published an edict from Nicomedia officially ending the persecutions.

Edict of Toleration by Galerius 

Since the fall of the Severan dynasty in AD 235, rivals for the imperial throne had bid for support by either favouring or persecuting Christians. The Edict of Toleration by Galerius had been issued by the emperor Galerius from Serdica and was posted at Nicomedia on 30 April 311. By its provisions, Christians who had "followed such a caprice and had fallen into such a folly that they would not obey the institutes of antiquity", were granted an indulgence.

Text of the Edict of Milan  
The actual letters have never been retrieved. However, they are quoted at length in Lactantius's On the Deaths of the Persecutors (De mortibus persecutorum), which gives the Latin text of both Galerius's edict of toleration as posted at Nicomedia on 30 April 311 and of Licinius's letter of toleration and restitution addressed to the governor of Bithynia and posted at Nicomedia on 13 June 313. The latter states:

Eusebius of Caesarea translated both documents into Greek in his History of the Church (Historia Ecclesiastica). His version of the letter of Licinius must derive from a copy posted in the province of Palaestina Prima (probably at its capital, Caesarea) in the late summer or early autumn of 313, but the origin of his copy of Galerius's edict of 311 is unknown since that does not seem to have been promulgated in Caesarea. In his description of the events in Milan in his Life of Constantine, Eusebius eliminated the role of Licinius, whom he portrayed as the evil foil to his hero Constantine.

The Edict of Milan was in effect directed against Maximinus Daza, the Caesar in the East who was at that time styling himself as Augustus. Having received the emperor Galerius' instruction to repeal the persecution in 311, Maximinus had instructed his subordinates to desist, but had not released Christians from prisons or virtual death-sentences in the mines, as Constantine and Licinius had both done in the West.

Following Galerius' death, Maximinus was no longer constrained; he enthusiastically took up renewed persecutions in the eastern territories under his control, encouraging petitions against Christians. One of those petitions, addressed not only to Maximinus but also to Constantine and Licinius, is preserved in a stone inscription at Arycanda in Lycia, and is a "request that the Christians, who have long been disloyal and still persist in the same mischievous intent, should at last be put down and not be suffered by any absurd novelty to offend against the honour due to the gods."

The edict is popularly thought to concern only Christianity, and even to make Christianity the official religion of the Empire (which did not occur until the Edict of Thessalonica in 380). Indeed, the Edict expressly grants religious liberty not only to Christians, who had been the object of special persecution, but goes even further and grants liberty to all religions:

Since Licinius composed the edict with the intent of publishing it in the east upon his hoped-for victory over Maximinus, it expresses the religious policy accepted by Licinius, a pagan, rather than that of Constantine, who was already a Christian. Constantine's own policy went beyond merely tolerating Christianity: he tolerated paganism and other religions, but he actively promoted Christianity.

Religious statement
Although the Edict of Milan is commonly presented as Constantine's first great act as a Christian emperor, it is disputed whether the Edict of Milan was an act of genuine faith. The document could be seen as Constantine's first step in creating an alliance with the Christian God, whom he considered the strongest deity. At that time, he was concerned about social stability and the protection of the empire from the wrath of the Christian God: in this view, the edict could be a pragmatic political decision rather than a religious shift. However, the majority of historians believe that Constantine's adoption of Christianity was genuine, and that the Edict of Milan was merely the first official act of Constantine as a dedicated Christian. This view is supported by Constantine's ongoing favors on behalf of Christianity during the rest of his reign.

Peace of the Church 
Galerius' earlier edict did nothing to restore the confiscated property of Christians. It was left to the Edict of Milan to do this. Instructions were given for Christians' meeting places and other properties to be returned and compensation paid by the state to the current owners:

It directed the provincial magistrates to execute this order at once with all energy so that public order may be restored and the continuance of divine favour may "preserve and prosper our successes together with the good of the state." Constantine ordered that the restitution should be at the expense of the State. For Christians, the immunities and guaranties contained in this act had most important results. For the first time, it became possible to observe publicly the liturgy in its fullness, and seriously and earnestly to attempt to mould the life of the empire according to Christian ideals and standards. The joy of the Christians at this change in their public status is expressed by Eusebius in his "Church History" (X, ii). This period of Church history is also known as the "Peace of the Church". Eusebius says that it stated: "it has pleased us to remove all conditions whatsoever." The edict further demanded that individual Romans right any wrongs towards Christians: "...the same shall be restored to the Christians without payment or any claim of recompense and without any kind of fraud or deception." While this provided restorative justice for Christians, the motivation for the provision was stated to be that the "…public order may be secured". The exhortation to right historic wrongs may also reflect the leaders' desires to avoid unfavorable consequences such as social unrest and further conquests. Koszarycz says that Constantine was superstitious and believed enough in the existence of the non-Christian gods to not want to offset the balance of good and evil. It was believed that, the sooner this balance was restored by the Romans establishing a state of justice with the Christians, the sooner the state would become stable.

The term "Peace of the Church" is also applied in England and Ireland to the ending of persecution that followed the Acts of Catholic Emancipation (1778–1926). In Germany, it is also applied to life after the Kulturkampf.

See also

Constantine the Great and Christianity
Constantinian shift
Peace of God

References

External links
Galerius and Constantine's Edicts of Toleration 311 and 313, from the Medieval Sourcebook (Lactantius's version of the Edict)
Edictum Mediolanense, as in Lactantius, De mortibus persecutorum, from The Roman Law Library at the University of Grenoble
 Imperial Decrees of Constantine from Eusebius's Ecclesiastical History.

Constantine the Great and Christianity
Edicts of toleration
Diocletianic Persecution
Christian terminology
History of Milan
Roman law
Religion law
Human rights
Freedom of religion
313
310s in the Roman Empire
4th-century Christianity
4th century in law